Aheri is a town and a tehsil and a district sub-division in Gadchiroli district in the Indian state of Maharashtra. It is located on the bank of Pranhita River, a tributary of Godavari River. This town is situated at the border of the Indian states of Maharashtra and Telangana. Aheri is known for its unity among the people. It represents religious, cultural and linguistic diversity. Aheri is among two Scheduled Area listed under Gadhiroli district by Government Of India. Viththal Rukhmai Mandir is the famous temple here, located right at the heart of the town.

Recently its urban status has been advanced to "Nagar Panchayat" from Gram Panchayat earlier on account of its rapid growth and development.

The Bridge Project on River Pranhita is in progress which creates physical links between Aheri in Maharashtra and Gudem in Telangana which promotes the historical cultural relations between the regions. This project is also expected to boost the economic growth of the town. Aheri is located at. It has an average elevation of 120 metres (396 feet).Here the main issue is with roads and peoples are helpful and now Raje Dharmarao Baba Atram is MLA and hence looking forward for development and the Nagar Panchayat of Aheri is near to police station in Gadaheri area well now the work of Maharashtra-Telangana bridge which was under construction now the work is completed before few months/years and hence here many waterfalls are also located. It has good culture and historical heritage, like Rajwada of Aheri, and the main attraction is on the occasion of Dussehra when about 20000 to 50000 peoples are visiting here to celebrate.

Aheri sub-division
Aheri is a sub-division of Gadchiroli district and consist of Aheri, Etapalli, Bhamragad and Sironcha tehsils.

References

Cities and towns in Gadchiroli district
Talukas in Maharashtra